Snooker at the 1976 Summer Paralympics consisted of two men's events. The competitions were held at the Seneca School in August 1972.

There were eighteen competitors, from six countries: five each from Canada and the United States, four from Great Britain, two from Brazil, and one each from Australia and the Republic of Ireland.

Dean Mellway won the gold medal in the Men 2–5 event, and Tommy Taylor won gold in the Men's A-C competition.

Medal summary

References 

1976 Summer Paralympics events
1976
Paralympics